Nauen is a town in the Havelland district, Brandenburg, Germany.

Nauen may also refer to:
 Nauener Tor, one of the three preserved gates of Potsdam
 Nauen Transmitter Station, oldest transmitting plant in the world, located in Brandenburg, Germany
 Nauen Radio Station, developed by Germany physicist Georg von Arco (1869–1940)
 Nauen line, railway track serving Narrow gauge small locomotives of the Deutsche Reichsbahn